Daniel George may refer to:
 Daniel George (rugby union) (born 1986), Welsh rugby player
 Chief Dan George (1899–1981), chief of the Tsleil-Waututh Nation, author, poet and actor
 Daniel G. George (1840–1916), Union Navy sailor and Medal of Honor recipient

See also

George Daniel (disambiguation)
Danielle George